The Cornwall Aces were the American Hockey League (AHL) affiliate of the National Hockey League's Quebec Nordiques from 1993 to 1995 and the relocated Colorado Avalanche in 1995–96. They were based in the eastern Ontario city of Cornwall and played at the Ed Lumley Arena inside the Cornwall Civic Complex. After one season being affiliated with Colorado, the franchise went dormant for three seasons, while the Avalanche transferred players to their other affiliate, the Hershey Bears. The franchise was resurrected in 1999 as the Wilkes-Barre/Scranton Penguins.

The Cornwall Aces won two division titles during their three-year stay in Cornwall. Coaches were Bob Hartley, who would coach the Colorado Avalanche, the Atlanta Thrashers and the Calgary Flames of the National Hockey League, and Jacques Martin, former head coach of the NHL's Ottawa Senators and Montreal Canadiens.

Season-by-season results

Regular season

Playoffs

References
 www.hockeydb.com
 List of NHLers who played for the Aces

 
Sport in Cornwall, Ontario
Ice hockey clubs established in 1993
Sports clubs disestablished in 1996
1993 establishments in Ontario
1996 disestablishments in Ontario
Quebec Nordiques minor league affiliates
Colorado Avalanche minor league affiliates